Rhopalophora is the genus name of:

 Rhopalophora (beetle), a genus of beetles in the family Cerambycidae.
 Rhopalophora (fungus), a lichen sac fungus in the order Eurotiomycetes.